Jegbefumere Albert (born 27 July 1981) is a Nigerian boxer who competed in the light heavyweight division. At the 2000 Summer Olympics, Albert was defeated by Rudolf Kraj from the Czech Republic during the quarterfinal match. In 2002 Commonwealth Games Jegbefumere Albert defeated Joseph Lubega (Ugandan) in the final to win a gold medal for Nigeria.

References

1981 births
Living people
Olympic boxers of Nigeria
Boxers at the 2000 Summer Olympics
Middleweight boxers
Nigerian male boxers
Boxers at the 2002 Commonwealth Games
Commonwealth Games medallists in boxing
Commonwealth Games gold medallists for Nigeria
African Games medalists in boxing
Competitors at the 1999 All-Africa Games
African Games silver medalists for Nigeria
20th-century Nigerian people
21st-century Nigerian people
Medallists at the 2002 Commonwealth Games